Worcester Sixth Form College is a 16-19 Academy in Worcester, England. It is located in the south-east of the city and was founded on the site of the former Worcester Grammar School for Girls following reorganisation in 1983.

Admissions
The college enrolled 1,569 students on daytime courses in 2008/09. As one of only two state schools offering sixth form education in Worcester, the school is specialised in mainstream education for students ages 16 – 19 most of whom were aged 16 to 18. The majority of students are full-time and follow National Curriculum GCE A-level courses. A February 2016 Ofsted inspection accorded the school a Grade 2 (Good).

It is situated in Red Hill, next-door to Worcestershire County Hall and south of Worcester Woods Country Park. It is just over a mile north of junction 7 of the M5, accessed via the A44 and A4440. New College Worcester, a school for the blind, is nearby to the south. Worcester's running track at the Nunnery Wood Sports Complex is behind the college and Nunnery Wood High School. DEFRA have a large site south of the college.

History

Grammar school
As the City of Worcester Grammar School for Girls, it was situated on Sansome Walk in the centre of Worcester. This has now become flats. It started in 1908 as the Worcester Secondary School for Girls, which moved into new buildings on 2 November 1910, and moved again in 1929 to a site in Barbourne. It became the City of Worcester Grammar School for Girls in September 1945. In September 1962 it moved to the Spetchley Road site.

Royal Grammar School Worcester was the analogous boys' school, and was partly maintained by Hereford and Worcester until 1983 when it became completely independent. Due to the boys' school becoming independent, the LEA proposed changes to its education policy (under a Conservative government) during 1982 to create a 'super' co-educational grammar school on the girls' school site to educate 125 boys and girls (potentially) from the whole of Hereford and Worcester. Sir Keith Joseph had doubts about the scheme. The grammar school closed in 1983.

Sixth form college
The sixth form college opened in September 1983 - instead of a 'super' 11-18 co-educational grammar school and six 11-16 comprehensives in Worcester, the sixth form college model was chosen with six comprehensives. In 1998, the LEA changed from Hereford & Worcester to Worcestershire.

Former teachers
 Labour MP for Redditch and former Home Secretary, Jacqui Smith
 Rosamund Stanhope, poet
Mary Taylor Slow, physicist, first woman to take up the study of radio as a profession.

Alumni
 Jake Abbott, rugby player
 Simon Archer, badminton player
 Kit Harington, actor
 Chelsea Weston, footballer
 Timothy Antstey, Teacher
 Cher Lloyd, singer

Worcester Grammar School for Girls
 Lesley Charles, runner-up in the 1974 Wimbledon Mixed Doubles (with Mark Farrell)
 Anne Diamond, journalist and presenter
 Nicky Gavron, Deputy Mayor of London from 2000–03 and 2004–08, Labour Member of the London Assembly from 2000-04 for Enfield and Haringey, and married to Robert Gavron, Baron Gavron
 Lindsey Hilsum, Channel 4 News International Editor, daughter of important physicist Prof Cyril Hilsum (who invented LCD screen technology at the nearby Royal Radar Establishment in Malvern)
 Jane Moore, Sun columnist
 Elizabeth Organ, artist and gallery owner
 Brigadier Gael Ramsey CBE, last Director of the Women's Royal Army Corps (WRAC) from 1989–92 and Chief Executive from 1997-2004 of the British Executive Service Overseas (merged with Voluntary Service Overseas in 2005)

See also
 Worcester College of Technology, local further education college

References

External links
 Worcester Sixth Form College Website
 Former school
 EduBase

Educational institutions established in 1962
Education in Worcester, England
Sixth form colleges in Worcestershire
Academies in Worcestershire